In the United States Congress, a conference report refers to the final version of a bill that is negotiated between the House of Representatives and the Senate via conference committee.  It is printed and submitted to each chamber for its consideration, such as approval or disapproval.  It contains the "statement of managers," a section-by-section explanation of the agreement.

Publication procedure
An amendment to Rule XXVIII of the Standing Rules of the United States Senate states:
9(a)(1) It shall not be in order to vote on the adoption of a report of a committee of conference unless such report has been available to Members and to the general public for at least 48 hours before such vote. If a point of order is sustained under this paragraph, then the conference report shall be set aside.

Normally, conference reports are printed and made available online in the Congressional Record the day after they have been filed. In those cases when the Government Publishing Office (GPO) is unable to print a conference report the next day, the GPO will scan the manuscript and post the searchable PDF of the manuscript on this web page. Otherwise, links to the conference reports as they appear in the Congressional Record will be posted on this web page.

Links to each conference report will be date and time stamped to establish when the conference report was first made available online to the public. If a conference report is scanned in manuscript form, that version will be superseded when the printed conference report is made available in the Congressional Record. Links to a conference report in the Congressional Record will be superseded when the conference report is made available in the congressional reports database.

Although the PDF of the scanned manuscript of a conference report will be searchable, handwritten notes or other illegible text may or may not be completely searchable. Regardless, the image of the handwritten notes, will be captured in the PDF of the scanned manuscript.

References

Legislative branch of the United States government